The Sherrill Mount House, also known as the Fries Hotel, Moundside Apartments, and The Inn at Sherrill, is a historic building located in Sherrill, Iowa, United States.  This is one of the few surviving pre-Civil War hotels left in Iowa, and one of the largest early stone structures remaining in rural Dubuque County.  The three-story building is composed of native limestone with a cupola on top of the hip roof.  It was built along a stagecoach route that traveled along the Mississippi River.  At one time it was situated on a  plot of land on which were several out buildings for an agricultural operation that included an orchard and vineyard. The building also served the community as a post office and meeting hall.  Before national prohibition in 1919 the inn included a beer garden, tavern and dance hall.  It was at this time that the building was converted into an apartment building.  It has subsequently been converted into a bed and breakfast called the Black Horse Inn.  The house was listed on the National Register of Historic Places in 2002.

References

Hotel buildings completed in 1856
Italianate architecture in Iowa
Bed and breakfasts in Iowa
Buildings and structures in Dubuque County, Iowa
National Register of Historic Places in Dubuque County, Iowa
Hotel buildings on the National Register of Historic Places in Iowa